The inherent bad faith model of information processing is a theory in political psychology that was first put forth by Ole Holsti to explain the relationship between John Foster Dulles' beliefs and his model of information processing.

It is the most widely studied model of one's opponent. A state is presumed to be implacably hostile, and contra-indicators of this are ignored. They are dismissed as propaganda ploys or signs of weakness. An example is John Foster Dulles' position regarding the Soviet Union.

See also

 Bad faith

References

International relations
Political science
Political psychology
Psychological models
Social concepts